Asadabad (also Romanized as Āsadābād) is a village in Kharaqan-e Gharbi Rural District, Central District, Avaj County, Qazvin Province, Iran. At the 2006 census, its population was 74, in 20 families.

References 

Populated places in Avaj County